The Schnittlauchinsel (German, lit. "chives island") is an island in the Walensee, located in the canton of Canton of St. Gallen. It is the only island in the lake and among the largest in the canton of St. Gallen. The island has a length of 80 metres and a maximum width of 20 metres. Its highest point is 420 metres above sea level, only 1 metre above lake level (419 m). The minimum distance from the shore is about 320 metres.

Politically the island belongs to the municipality of Quarten in the district of Sarganserland.

See also 

 List of islands of Switzerland

References
Swisstopo topographic maps

External links
Schnittlauchinsel on MySwitzerland.com
Schnittlauchinsel on Heidiland.com (German)

Landforms of the canton of St. Gallen
Walensee
Lake islands of Switzerland